A polar diagram, or polar plot, is a graph that shows a sailboat's potential speed over a range of wind speeds and relative wind angles. It normally consists of the right side of a line chart with the radius representing the yacht speed and the angle representing the wind direction blowing from top to bottom.  Several lines are normally drawn on the chart representing wind speed. To identify how fast a yacht could potentially go you select a particular wind speed curve and particular wind angle. Refer to the graph to the right for an example.

Polar diagrams are normally specific to a particular sailboat design and are created by the yacht designer.  Polar diagrams can also be created using a velocity prediction program or by a range of computer programs including iPolar and iRegatta.

See also 
 Forces on sails

External links
 ORC Sailboat Data a large database of polar diagrams maintained by the Offshore Racing Congress

References 

Naval architecture
Sailing